Mike Southon is a British entrepreneur and author.

Education

Mike Southon was educated at Papplewick School, Ascot (where he was a contemporary of Richard Curtis) and Wellington College, Crowthorne (where in 1967 he met Chris West, who was to become his co-author).

He subsequently attended Imperial College London to read mechanical engineering, but left after a year. He worked at Tate & Lyle Research in Reading for a while and then went on to the University of Bradford to read chemical engineering and management economics.

Work

Southon was co-founder of The Instruction Set, a Unix training company, in 1984. Other co-founders were Peter Griffiths and Mike Banahan. The company grew to 150 people, then was bought out in 1989 by Hoskyns Group (now part of Capgemini).

During the 1990s, he was involved with 17 startup companies, including Riversoft and Micromuse, both of which had public floatations.

In 2002, he published The Beermat Entrepreneur with Chris West. This book criticises the approach to entrepreneurship taught in many business schools as excessively corporate, and instead presents a model whereby customers are found as quickly as possible and where formal business planning is only carried out once the entrepreneur is sure of the product and where it fits in the market.

The entrepreneur is presented as a specific kind of individual, with strengths and weaknesses (as opposed to models whereby entrepreneurship is seen as a set of behaviours that anyone can carry out). Such a person needs to work with particular individuals at different times in the business' life – with a small group of expert 'cornerstones' at the start, with a 'dream team' of committed, 'can-do' individuals as the company grows to 25 people, then with more conventional employees after that point.

Several other books followed, including two 'Beermat Guides' in sales and finance, and a book for intrapreneurs, The Boardroom Entrepreneur.

Southon has written regular columns for the Daily Telegraph, Financial Times (weekly, for four years) and Mail on Sunday.

He is now one of the most experienced entrepreneur mentors in the UK, having done face-to-face sessions with over 2,000 people in the last fifteen years.

He has also spoken at over 1,000 live events, and interviewed many business celebrities on stage, including Sir Richard Branson at the first International Festival of Business in Liverpool, where he was Entrepreneur in Residence for two years

In 2018, a thoroughly revised edition of The Beermat Entrepreneur was published. While maintaining the basic outlines of the 'Beermat' model of business growth, the model has been finessed. In the original book, a five-way equity split between entrepreneur and cornerstones was suggested, but this has been changed. The role of the entrepreneur's supporting 'foil' is discussed. The material on business ethics is expanded. Experiences of entrepreneurs who used the original model (or parts of it) are included, and the marketing section has been updated to discuss social media.

Mike is Entrepreneur in Residence at Cass Business School, where he and Chris West teach 'Introduction to Entrpeneurship' and 'Marketing Strategy' to undergraduates in Business Management.
 
Mike's alter ego is Mike Fab-Gere, a 60s and 70s rock star. 
The band was started in 1991 and for many years was the top draw on the college circuit, then toured No. 1 theatres and still undertakes corporate events.
Band members have included musicians from Deep Purple, Iron Maiden and The Zombies.

He was also previously the front man and singer for The Oxcentrics, a Dixieland jazz band based in Oxford, in which Chris West also played on drums.

Books 
 The Beermat Entrepreneur: Turn a Good Idea into a Great Business, Mike Southon and Chris West. Prentice Hall, 2002. . Also 2005, .
 The Beermat Entrepreneur – Live, Mike Southon and Chris West. Financial Times / Prentice Hall, 2002. . (Audio CD.)
 The Boardroom Entrepreneur, Mike Southon and Chris West. Random House Business Books, 2005. .
 Sales on a Beermat, Mike Southon and Chris West. Random House Business Books, 2005. .
 Finance on a Beermat, Mike Southon and Chris West. Random House Business Books, 2006. .
 This is How Yoodoo it: Great Advice from Some of the UK's Top Thinkers on Entrepreneurship, Mike Southon. Ecademy Press, 2010. .
 The Beermat Entrepreneur: Turn a Good Idea into a Great Business Third Edition, Mike Southon and Chris West. Pearson Education, 2018. .

References

External links 
 Mike Southon website
 Mike Southon on Twitter

Year of birth missing (living people)
Living people
People educated at Wellington College, Berkshire
Alumni of Imperial College London
Alumni of the University of Bradford
English businesspeople
British non-fiction writers
Academics of London South Bank University
People educated at Papplewick School
British male writers
Oxcentrics members
Male non-fiction writers